Chemistry is a 2009 Malayalam Horror film directed by Viji Thampi based on a true story about a high school student.

Plot
The story revolves in the background of Mount Academy School, where three girls, Gowri (Shilpa Bala), Kalyani and Alina were found dead possibly due to suicide. After some time, all the people in the school return to a normal stage.

A girl Parvathy (Saranya Mohan), newly joins the school who is the niece of Sreekanth (Mukesh), the Superintendent of Police, who is probing the death case. Parvathy lives in the same room where Gowri lived. After some days, the vengeful spirit of Gowri appears in front of Parvathy, to help her to take revenge from the people who killed her. Parvathy becomes friendly to the spirit soon.

Now Gowri starts telling her story how she had doting parents, best friends and a peaceful life. All this was interrupted when Aloshy (Vineeth), the dance teacher of the three dead girls takes naked pictures through hidden cameras. Aloshy, at several occasions blackmailed these girls to leak these pictures in the internet. The girls are frightened now as Aloshy always wanted to have sex with them.

One fine day, these girls are about to reveal everything to the teachers but Aloshy and his lover Jennifer kill these girls. Kalyani and Alina were dead, but Gowri did not die instantly. He pours more poison in Gowri's mouth, and finally kills her.

In the meanwhile, Parvathy starts to behave like Gowri, which turns everybody in horror. They call an exorcist, who says that Gowri's vengeful spirit has entered Parvathy's body.

Gowri is back to kill Aloshy and Jennifer. She succeeds in killing both of them. Gowri puts fire in Jennifer's room and kills her, turning her body beyond recognition and she pushes off Aloshy from the terrace of his house and kills him.

Gowri's spirit now finds peace and bids goodbye to Parvathy, leaving her sad.

Cast

Soundtrack
All songs were written by Bichu Thirumala.

"Muthuchippi Chellakkanne" - M Jayachandran
"Paattu Paadi" - Jassie Gift, Rimi Tomy
"Vande Maatharam" - Alex Kayyalaykkal, Chorus, Shweta Mohan, TT Sainoj
"Muthuchippi Chellakkanne (female)" - Sujatha Mohan

External links
 
 Movie Review Chemistry 

2000s Malayalam-language films
2009 horror films
Indian teen films
Indian horror films
2000s teen horror films
2009 films
Films directed by Viji Thampi
Films scored by M. Jayachandran